Muazzez İlmiye Çığ (born 20 June 1914) is a Turkish archaeologist and Assyriologist who specializes in the study of Sumerian civilization. She stirred controversy in the Muslim world and received world-wide media coverage in 2006 with her assertion - outlined in her book from the previous year - that the headscarf worn by Arab women did not originate in the Muslim world, but was actually worn five thousand years earlier by Sumerian priestesses as a means of initiating young men into sex.

Early life
Muazzez İlmiye İtil's parents were Crimean Tatars both of whose families had immigrated to Turkey, with her father's side settling in the town of Merzifon, and her mother's side in the northwestern city of Bursa, Turkey's fourth-largest, which was, at the time, a major regional administrative center of the Ottoman Empire.   Muazzez İlmiye was born in Bursa, a few weeks before the outbreak of World War I and, by the time of her fifth birthday in 1919, the Greek Army's invasion of İzmir prompted her father, who was a teacher, to seek safety for the family by moving to the city of Çorum where young Muazzez completed her primary studies.  She subsequently returned to Bursa and, by the time of her 17th birthday in 1931, graduated from its training facility for elementary school teachers.

Educational credentials
After nearly five years of educating children in another northwestern city, Eskişehir, she began studies in 1936 at Ankara University's  Department of Hittitology. Among her teachers were two of the period's most eminent scholars of Hittite culture and history, Hans Gustav Güterbock and Benno Landsberger, both Hitler-era German-Jewish refugees, who spent World War II as professors in Turkey.

Upon receiving her degree in 1940, she began a multi-decade career at Museum of the Ancient Orient, one of three such institutions comprising Istanbul Archaeology Museums, as a resident specialist in the field of cuneiform tablets, thousands of which were being stored untranslated and unclassified in the facility's archives.  In the intervening years, due to her efforts in the deciphering and publication of the tablets, the Museum became a Middle Eastern languages learning center attended by ancient history researchers from every part of the world.

Professional career and court case

Married to M. Kemal Çığ, the director of Topkapı Museum, Muazzez İlmiye Çığ is also a prominent advocate for  secularism and women's rights in Turkey, and an honorary member of German Archeology Institute and İstanbul University Institute of Prehistoric Sciences.  She has gained renown in her profession for the diligent and systematic investigation evident in her books, scholarly papers and general interest articles published in magazines and newspapers such as Belleten and Bilim ve Ütopya.  In 2002, her autobiography, Çivi çiviyi söker, framed as a series of interviews by journalist Serhat Öztürk was published by the country's premier national financial institution Türkiye İş Bankası.

She and her publisher were charged with "inciting hatred based on religious differences".  The dismissal of the charges in the first hearing on 31 October 2006, and her acquittal brought additional publicity to Prof. Çığ.
In her trial, she denied the charges, declaring "I am a woman of science ... I never insulted anyone". At that initial trial hearing, the judge dismissed her case and, following a trial less than half hour in duration, the book's publisher was acquitted.

Partial bibliography
1993: Zaman Tüneli ile Sümer'e Yolculuk [Journey to Sumer through a Time Tunnel" (written as children's educational literature)
1995: Kur'an, İncil ve Tevrat'ın Sümer'deki Kökeni [The Origins of the Koran, the Bible and the Torah in Sumer]
1996: Sümerli Ludingirra [Ludingirra the Sumerian, a retrospective science-fiction] (İbrahim Peygamber) 
1997: The Prophet Abram, According to Sumerian Writings and Archeological Findings 
1998: İnanna'nın Aşkı [The Love of Inanna, the Belief and the Holy Marriage in Sumer]
2000: Hititler ve Hattuşa [The Hittites and Hattuša, as Written by Ishtar] (Ortadoğu Uygarlık Mirası) 
2002: Civilization Heritage in the Middle East2005: Bereket Kültü ve Mabet Fahişeliği [Cult of Fertility and Holy Prostitution'']
Works include numerous translations from English.

References

External links
Muazzez İlmiye Çığ website

Turkish non-fiction writers
Turkish archaeologists
Turkish Assyriologists
Academic staff of Istanbul University
Turkish former Muslims
Turkish atheists
Turkish secularists
People from Bursa
Turkish people of Crimean Tatar descent
1914 births
Living people
Ankara University alumni
Turkish centenarians
Turkish women writers
Women centenarians
Women orientalists
Turkish women archaeologists
Assyriologists